Shidrovo is a rural locality (a settlement) and the administrative center of Shidrovskoye Rural Settlement of Vinogradovsky District, Arkhangelsk Oblast, Russia. The population was 493 as of 2010. There are 7 streets.

Geography 
Shidrovo is located on the Vaga River, 49 km southeast of Bereznik (the district's administrative centre) by road. Shidrovo (village) is the nearest rural locality.

References 

Rural localities in Vinogradovsky District